Nath Kutir is a colony in Sirsaganj town, Firozabad district, in the Indian state of Uttar Pradesh. It is located on the way to Bah from Sirsaganj.

The colony got its name from the name Nath Baba, and this name was given by Aamod Yadav S/o Shree Hakim Singh Yadav.

Nearby 

 Girdhari Inter College
 M D Jain Inter College
 Indira Memorial Sr. Sec. School

Demographics 
As of the 2013 India census, Nath Kuteer had a population of 600 people.{
  "type": "FeatureCollection",
  "features": [
    {
      "type": "Feature",
      "properties": {},
      "geometry": {
        "type": "LineString",
        "coordinates": [
          [
            78.6795247066766,
            27.060043901766015
          ],
          [
            78.67761694360524,
            27.058415021993042
          ],
          [
            78.67972042411566,
            27.05879432722049
          ],
          [
            78.68045078124852,
            27.059501690907524
          ],
          [
            78.67951003834607,
            27.060041625142762
          ]
        ]
      }
    },
    {
      "type": "Feature",
      "properties": {},
      "geometry": {
        "type": "Point",
        "coordinates": [
          78.67920041084291,
          27.059412416952107
        ]
      }
    }
  ]
}

References

Cities and towns in Firozabad district